Alfredo Aceto (born 1991) is a visual artist based between Turin and Geneva. Aceto was born in Turin, Italy.
He studied fine arts at ECAL.His work has been exhibited in many international surveys, including DOC!, Paris, Museo Pietro Canonica, Rome, Museo del 900, Milan, Centre d’Art Contemporain de Genève, Geneva, and Kunsthaus Glarus, Glarus. His practice includes film, installation, performance, text and sculpture, and is mainly concerned with the body and the biography.

Art work 
Using among others sculpture, film and sound, Italian Swiss-based artist Alfredo Aceto creates spaces suspended between fiction and reality. His environments are places to live, in which one can find a sort of melancholy, artificial time alteration and image saturation. The objects he produces are traces, functional elements for the construction of the space where the blurred boundaries between his personal timeline and the collective one express the way chronology can be manipulate. His work arises from the will to create a place where would mix together the various strata of a linear form of time, turning into a platform from which signs of different ages emerge. Developing his work in a creative path that passes through multiple and never truly resolved phases of growth. Alfredo Aceto nurtures his own research by questioning his own self and, more in general, the ego that reigns in every person, if only on a latent level. 
Aceto is currently teaching at ECAL in Lausanne.
In 2018 he is nominated for Swiss Art Awards in Basel.
In 2019 he is the recipient of the prestigious Leenaards Culture Grant from the Fondation Leenaards.

Exhibitions

Solo and Duo exhibitions 

 2021 Ambarabà ciccì coccò, with Denis Savary, Kunst Halle Sankt Gallen St. Gallen
 2021 Last Tango Zurich
 2021 L'Ascensore Palermo
 2021 Galerie Parliament Unlimited Paris
 2021 Brains & Bronze, Laurence & Friends, Espace HIT Genève
 2021 My Italian is a Little Rusty, Galerie Lange + Pult Auvernier
 2020 Kevin, Kunst Raum Riehen Riehen
 2019 Sequoia 07, Swiss Institute, Milan
 2018 Azure, Dittrich & Schlechtriem, Berlin
 2017 Unreachable Turtles, Lateral Art Space, Cluj-Napoca
 2017 Endemisms, Andersen's Contemporary, Copenhagen
 2016 Something between Posthistoria and Prehistoria, Barriera and Albert Stiftung Foundation, Turin
 2016 Modesty or Surprise, Museo Pietro Canonica a Villa Borghese, Rome
 2016 Everyone stands alone at the heart of the world, pierced by a ray of sunlight, and suddenly it’s evening, COSMIC Galerie, Bugada & Cargnel Paris
 2015 Refaire le Portrait #Acte 1, Kunsthalle Geneva, Genève
 2015 Refaire le Portrait #Acte 2, Lavorare lavorare lavorare, preferisco il rumore del mare, Kunsthalle Geneva, Centre D'Art Contemporain, Geneva
 2014 Prophétie et Croque-Monsieurs, Happy Baby Gallery, Lausanne
 2014 HARAM, Frutta, Rome

Selected group exhibitions 

 2020 Blade Banner, Sprint, Spazio Maiocchi, Milan
 2020 The Living Room, ArtGenève, curated by Samuel Gross, Geneva
 2020 UPLIFT, Galerie Xippas, Geneva
 2020 La Totale, Moulin de Sainte Marie, Les Moulins
 2020 The Crowning Show, Galerie Lange + Pult, Zurich
 2019 #80|90, Académie de France à Rome, Villa Medici, Rome
 2019 Immersione Libera, Palazzina dei bagni misteriosi, Milan
 2019 Still Life: An Ongoing Story, Galerie Sébastien Bertrand, Geneva
 2019 La métamorphose de l’art imprimé, Zeitgenössische Westschweizer Editionen und serielle Unikate, VFO, Verein fur Originalgraphik, Zurich
 2019 Art Basel Lounge, Messe Basel, Basel
 2019 The Big Rip, Bounce Chill or Crunch?, Last Tango , Zurich
 2018 Swiss Art Awards, Messe Basel, Basel
 2018 Le Colt est Jeune & Haine, DOC!, curated by Cédric Fauq, Paris
 2018 Greffes, Galerie Rolando Anselmi, Berlin
 2018 Talent Prize, Mattatoio, Rome
 2018 Performance Program Code Art Fair, curated by Irene Campolmi, Bella Center, Copenaghen
 2018 Greffes, Lateral Art Space, Cluj-Napoca
 2018 Re-Routing Nature, Alfredo Aceto, Jakob Kudsk Steensen, Adrien Missika, Biitsi, Rune Bosse, Viktor Timofeev, curated by Irene Campolmi, Sixty-Eight Art Institute, Copenaghen
 2018 Greffes, Beatrice Burati Anderson Art Space, Venice
 2017 La Norme Idéale, Levy Delval, Brussels
 2017 X, Galerie l'ELAC, Renens
 2017 Shivers Only, with Iván Argote, Mohamed Bourouissa, Antoine Donzeaud, Julien Goniche, Angélique Heidler, Thomas Mailaender, Hubert Marot, Naoki Sutter-Shudo, La Paix, Paris
 2017 National Museum of Contemporary Art, Bucharest
 2017 Terrasse 2017, Silicon Malley, Lausanne
 2017 Greffes, with Mohamed Namou, Achraf Touloub, Villa Medici, Rome
 2017 Happiness is a Fiat 500, White Cuib, Cluj-Napoca
 2017 Mementos, curated by Piper Marshall and Jens Hoffmann, Tours et Taxis, Brussels
 2017 Prix MAIF pour la sculpture 2017, MAIF Social Club, Paris
 2017 Alfredo Aceto, Nicola Martini, Lionel Maunz, DITTRICH & SCHLECHTRIEM, Berlin
 2017 Premio Moroso, curated by Andrea Bruciati and Paola Pivi, Museo Etnografico, Udine
 2017 Solidi Platoonici, La Rada, Locarno
 2017 General Audition, curated by Samuel Gross and Stéphane Kropf, L'élac, Lausanne
 2016 In Mostra - corpo, gesto, postura, curated by Simone Menegoi, Artissima, Turin
 2016 The Milky Way, Gio Marconi, Milan
 2016 Il Principio è solo e solo un centro spostato verso il centro, COSMIC Galerie, Bugada & Cargnel Paris
 2016 Souvenir d'été, Villa Medici, Rome
 2016 I would've Done Everything For You / Gimme More!, Flat 7, 22 Westland Place, curated by Cédric Fauq, London
 2016 Kiefer-Ablitzel, Swiss Art Awards, Basel
 2016 All the Lights We Cannot See, Random Institute, Pyongyang
 2016 Texture and Liquidity, The Workbench International, Milan
 2015 Death of the Shambls, Silicon Malley, Prilly
 2015 Wincklemans, PAZIOLI, Chavannes-près-Renens
 2015 Unter 30 Junge Schweizer Kunst Kiefer Hablitzel Preis, Kunsthaus Glarus, Glarus
 2015 Nuit des Musées, Musée Jenisch, Vevey
 2015 Kiefer-Ablitzel, Swiss Art Awards, Basel
 2015 LISTE, Bugada & Cargnel, Basel
 2015 L'heure qu'il est, Centre d'Art Contemporain (CACY), Yverdon-les-Bains
 2015 Lavorare lavorare lavorare, preferisco il rumore del mare, Kunsthalle Geneva, Centre D'Art Contemporain, Geneva
 2015 Club of Matinée Idolz, CO2, Turin
 2014 The Go-Between, Museo di Capodimonte, Naples
 2014 The Arcades Project, Galerie Bugada & Cargnel, Paris
 2014 Jump, Gasconade at Art-O-Rama, Marseille
 2014 Partis Pris, Blancpain Art Contemporain, Geneva
 2014 World Wide, WALLRISS, Fribourg
 2013 One Thousand Four Hundred and Sixty Peep-Hole, Peep-Hole, Milan
 2013 Sol LeWit Loves Pancakes, ZIP, Basel
 2013 ARI MORTIS, curated by Milovan Farronato and Roberto Cuoghi, Museo del 900, Milan, Italy
 2012 There is a différence between a shaky or out-of-focus photograph and a snapshot of clouds and fog banks, curated by Philippe Decrauzat, ECAL
 2011 Fforfake, Belvedere di San Leucio, Caserta
 2011 This is Tomorrow, Alfredo Aceto, Trisha Baga, Benjamin Senior, Jacob Kerray, Aaron Angell, Ben Schumacher, David Ostrowski, Galleria Annarumma, Naples
 2011 Nero su Nero, Galleria Franz Paludetto, Turin
 2011 Soirée, Centro Luigi Pecci, Prato
 2011 Lanificio, Lanificio 159 Magazzino dell'arte, Rome
 2011 Bramante & Friends, Galleria Nicola Pedana, Caserta
 2011 Km011, Turin Museum of Natural History, Turin
 2010 OPS!, Ambassade de France en Italie, Turin
 2009 La ricostruzione dei mondi, Galleria Changing Role, Rome
 2009 I ricordanti, Museo d'arte contemporanea La Filanda dei Cipressi del Real Belvedere di San Leucio, Caserta

Residencies 

 2020 Istituto Svizzero, Milan
 2018 Swiss Art Awards, Messe Basel, Basel
 2018 Talent Prize, InsideArt Magazine, Rome
 2017 MAIF, Prix pour la sculpture, Paris
 2017 Premio Moroso, Udine
 2016 Cité internationale des arts, Paris
 2016 Kiefer Hablitzel Preis, Messe Basel, Basel
 2016 MSA^, Mountain School of Art, Los Angeles
 2015 Kiefer Hablitzel Preis, Messe Basel, Basel
 2015 Kunsthalle Geneva, Centre d’Art Contemporain, Geneva
 2014 Residency Unlimited (RU), New York City
 2013 Full Scale, Museo del Novecento, Milan
 2013 ArtPort, Tel Aviv
 2010 Ville de Lille, Lille

Publications 

 Immersione Libera, ed Galleria Continua
 ArtClub, ed Pier Paolo Pancotto, Académie de France à Rome - Villa Médicis
 Fortezzuola, ed Pier Paolo Pancotto, Nero Magazine
 Premio Moroso, text by Cédric Fauq. Catalogue
 As If We Never Said Goodbye, text by Elise Lammer. Ed. Dittrich & Schlechtriem
 Something between Posthistoria and Prehistoria. Texts by Stéphanie Serra and Tristan Lavoyer. Barriera and Albert Stiftung Foundation (Pro Helvetia)
 Alfredo Aceto | Andrea Bellini. First Monograph HAPAX. JRP Ringier 2015
 Unter 30 XI Junge Schweizer Kunst Kiefer Hablitzel Preis. Catalogue. Kunsthaus Glarus
 L'heure qu'il est, Centre d'Art Contemporain Yverdon (CACY). Catalogue
 TEXTSCORE. Entretiens avec Arthur Fouray
 De Generation of Painting. Fondazione 107
 The Go In Between. Museo di Capodimonte
 Km011. Umberto Allemandi & C
 Interview Julien Previeux. Alfredo Aceto and Jean Bourgois, ECAL

References

External links 

 (English)  
 (English)  
 (German)  
 (French) 
 (French) 

Italian contemporary artists
Swiss contemporary artists
1991 births
Artists from Turin
Living people